Kompas TV Jawa Timur (formerly known as BCTV, Business Channel Television dan Kompas TV Surabaya) is an Indonesian local television channel based in Surabaya. It began broadcasting on July 7, 2009 from 8.00 pm until 00.00 am each day on Channel 40 UHF, currently it is on Channel 29 UHF. It is intended that broadcast coverage will gradually include Surabaya, Sidoarjo, Gresik, Lamongan, Pasuruan, Kamal and Bangkalan. Kompas TV Surabaya program content emphasizes business and lifestyle programming with a lesser focus on education and entertainment.

Coverage area 
Kompas TV Jawa Timur broadcast in region Surabaya, Sidoarjo, Gresik, Lamongan, Pasuruan, Kamal and Bangkalan.

Programs 
 Kompas Jawa Timur (Compass East Java)
 Kompas Jatim Sepekan
 Kompas Nusantara
 Sapa Jatim
 Peluang Emas
 Bingkai Hati
 Sentuhan Hati

Events ever aired

 1001 Surabaya
 Sebelah Mata (Eleven Eyes)
 Stasiun Komedi (Comedy Station)
 I Love Surabaya
 I Love Jatim

External links 
 

Television stations in Indonesia
Television channels and stations established in 2009
Mass media in Surabaya